The , inaccurately and colloquially known as a knee mortar by Allied forces, is a Japanese grenade launcher or light mortar that was widely used in the Pacific Theater of World War II. It got the nickname the "knee mortar" because of an erroneous Allied belief that these launchers could be fired by propping its plate against the leg. However, anyone trying to fire it this way would receive a severe bruise (or sometimes a broken thigh bone) from its hefty recoil.

Background
The Japanese Army, noting that grenades were short-ranged weapons, began efforts to optimize these weapons for close-in infantry fighting.  After studying employment of grenades and mortars on the battlefield, the Japanese Army developed hand grenades, rifle grenades, and grenade and mortar shell dischargers (small mortars) suited to warfare in typical short-range combat environments such as urban, trench, and jungle warfare.

As part of this effort, the Japanese Army had adopted by 1932 a set of fragmentation grenades with almost universal adaptability.  The Type 91 fragmentation grenade could be thrown by hand, fired from a spigot-type launcher, or used in a mortar-like grenade discharger,  the Type 89.

Design and operation
The Type 89 heavy grenade discharger was adopted in 1929, but production did not begin until 1932. It differs from the earlier Type 10 grenade discharger in that it has a rifled barrel. The Type 89 could fire two types of grenades or shells: the Type 91 grenade, which was a normal infantry fragmentation grenade adapted to the Type 89 discharger, and the Type 89 50 mm shell, which was an impact-detonated shell with considerably more explosive power.

When fired from the Type 89 discharger, the Type 91 fragmentation grenade was fitted with a propellant base and time fuse. It did not explode upon contact, but was designed to ignite its fuse while in flight. A weak creep spring inside the grenade firing mechanism allowed the firing pin to be thrown back upon launching, igniting a time fuse with a 7-8 second delay. Using this system, the Type 91 grenades could be launched through jungle cover or through small openings without the danger of premature detonation in the event the grenade struck an object on its way to the target.  Although the Type 89 could be fired by a single person, it was typically operated with a crew of 3, enabling it to reach a rate of fire of about 25 rounds per minute.

The Type 89 discharger could also be used with a more powerful impact-detonated shell approaching the power of a light mortar. To fire the shell (which had a nose-mounted impact fuse that detonated on contact), it was dropped base-down inside the tube of the discharger. By setting the Type 89 discharger at a fixed angle of 45 degrees, and varying distance to target by adjusting the size of a variable chamber space inside the discharger mechanism (see also the Granatnik wz. 36), soldiers could adjust fire onto multiple targets at varying ranges while firing the contact-detonated 50 mm shell through a single small clearing in the jungle canopy. The method worked equally well when firing from deep trenches or pits, or between various building obstructions when fighting inside a built-up town or city.

With its curved support plate, the Type 89 was designed to be placed on the ground or against a log or trunk at a fixed firing angle of 45 degrees. However, since it used a spring-loaded, lanyard-operated firing pin mechanism, in an emergency it could fire grenades or shells at point targets while braced horizontally against a tree or building.

Combat use
The Imperial Japanese Army issued three Type 89s per platoon, making it their most widely used infantry fire support weapon.

The Type 89 discharger saw service at the Battle of Khalkhin Gol in Manchuria during the Second Sino-Japanese War. During World War II, the weapon was used effectively against the Allied defenders in the Battle of Corregidor in May 1942. It also saw service in Burma and the Pacific islands. Japanese Navy paratroopers carried special containers for the Type 89 clipped to their harnesses to provide fire support right on the landing zone.

After World War II the Type 89 was used by Indonesian National Army and militias against Dutch forces in the Indonesian National Revolution, with copies of the weapon manufactured in Demakijo, Yogyakarta. Others were used by Communist forces during Chinese Civil War and Korean War. Some were also used by the Việt Minh during First Indochina War and by the Viet Cong during the Vietnam War.

Ammunition

 Type 89 50 mm HE (high explosive) mortar shell (fitted with impact detonator) [Weight: ~2.00 lb (0.91 kg)]
 Type 91 fragmentation grenade (fitted with 7 second delay time fuse, ignited in flight)
 Type 94 50 mm practice shell
 Smoke shell weight: 0.9 kg containing 0.11 kg of HC type smoke mixture
 Incendiary shell weight: 0.57 kg containing 0.32 kg of incendiary material

Users 

 : Imperial Japanese Army
 : Indonesian National Army

Notes

References
 Leo J. Daugherty III, Fighting Techniques of a Japanese Infantryman 1941–1945, 
 Gordon L Rottman, Japanese Infantryman 1937-45 Sword of the empire, 
 US Army field manual TM-E 30-480 at hyperwar
 Taki (Type 89)
 U.S. World War II Intel Report on Japanese Smoke Grenades

See also 
 Chinese Type 27
 Commando mortar, a class of infantry light mortars designed for maximum portability and rapid deployment, at the expense of accuracy and rate of fire.
Lance-grenade individuel Mle F1 (LGI Mle F1), a French close-support weapon infantry weapon designed to be used by one man

External links
 Nambu World: Type 89 “Knee Mortar” (Grenade Launcher)
 Type 91 grenade at inert-ord.net
 Type 89 grenade at inert-ord.net
 Colour pictures of the Type 89 and Type 10 at carbinesforcollectors.com

89
89
Infantry mortars of Japan
50 mm artillery
Military equipment introduced in the 1920s